The HD Pentax-D FA 70–210mm f/4.0 ED SDM WR lens is a telephoto zoom lens for the Pentax K-mount. The lens was on the roadmap since 2019, has been announced in January 2020 and should be available from March 2020. It is an additional full-frame lens to reboot Pentax' involvement in that format, the last previously introduced newly developed full-frame lens being the D FA* 50mm ED SDM AW in 2018. On Pentax APS-C cameras, the D FA 70–210mm has an equivalent focal length range of 107–322mm.

This lens offers many features of the 2017 introduced D FA* 70-200mm 2.8.

While this lens is developed and manufactured by Tamron, Pentax offers an optically identical lens as part for their K-Mount.

See also 
 Pentax (lens)

References

External links 
 HD Pentax-D FA 70–210mm f/4.0 ED SDM WR, official Product page
 HD PENTAX-D FA 70-210mm F4 ED SDM WR: A compact, lightweight, high-performance telephoto zoom lens, press release
 About HD Coating, Featured Product Site

70-210
Camera lenses introduced in 2020